Oerane pugnans, the pugnacious lancer,  is a species of butterfly in the family Hesperiidae. It was described by Lionel de Nicéville in 1891. It is found in the Indomalayan realm (Burma, Thailand, Malaysia, Singapore, Borneo, Sumatra, Siberut, Nias, Bangka and Java).

References

External links
Pemara at Markku Savela's Lepidoptera and Some Other Life Forms

Hesperiidae
Butterflies described in 1891